Schinia rufipenna is a moth of the family Noctuidae. Only a few populations are known, mainly in Florida,  but there is also one record for Louisiana.

Adults are on wing in November.

The larvae feed on the flowers and developing seeds of Pityopsis graminifolia.

External links
Images
Species profile

Schinia
Moths of North America
Moths described in 1983